Insar is the name of several inhabited localities in the Republic of Mordovia, Russia.

Urban localities
Insar, Insarsky District, Republic of Mordovia, a town in Insarsky District

Rural localities
Insar, Kadoshkinsky District, Republic of Mordovia, a settlement in Pushkinsky Selsoviet of Kadoshkinsky District